The Superior Court of California, County of Riverside, also known as the Riverside County Superior Court, is the branch of the California superior courts with jurisdiction over Riverside County.

History

Riverside County was formed in 1893 from San Bernardino and San Diego counties.

The cornerstone for the first permanent Riverside County Courthouse was laid on May 7, 1903, and the building was completed in June 1904. The Beaux Arts courthouse occupies nearly one city block and is modeled on the Grand Palais in Paris. Franklin P. Burnham is credited as the architect.

Venues

Riverside County Superior Court has fifteen courthouses divided into three regions:
 
Banning
Corona
Moreno Valley
Riverside (county seat)
 
Hemet
Murrieta
Temecula
 
Blythe
Indio
Palm Springs

References

External links
 

Superior Court
Superior courts in California